Delcho Stoilov  (born 31 December 1981) is a Bulgarian footballer, who currently plays for Dimitrovgrad as a midfielder.

External links 
  FootballDatabase.eu profile

1981 births
Living people
Bulgarian footballers
PFC Kaliakra Kavarna players
First Professional Football League (Bulgaria) players
Association football midfielders